The group stage of the 2007 CAF Confederation Cup was played from 21 July to 7 October 2007. A total of eight teams competed in the group stage.

Format
In the group stage, each group was played on a home-and-away round-robin basis. The winners of each group advanced directly to the final.

Groups

Group A
{| class="wikitable" style="text-align: center;"
|-
!width="165"|Team
!width="20"|Pts
!width="20"|Pld
!width="20"|W
!width="20"|D
!width="20"|L
!width="20"|GF
!width="20"|GA
!width="20"|GD
|- style="background: #ccffcc;"
|style="text-align:left;"| CS Sfaxien
|13||6||4||1||1||13||4||+9
|- bgcolor=
|style="text-align:left;"| TP Mazembe
|12||6||4||0||2||11||9||+2
|- bgcolor=
|style="text-align:left;"| Mamelodi Sundowns
|6||6||2||0||4||7||13||-6
|- bgcolor=
|style="text-align:left;"| Les Astres FC
|4||6||1||1||4||5||10||-5
|}

Group B
{| class="wikitable" style="text-align: center;"
|-
!width="165"|Team
!width="20"|Pts
!width="20"|Pld
!width="20"|W
!width="20"|D
!width="20"|L
!width="20"|GF
!width="20"|GA
!width="20"|GD
|- style="background: #ccffcc;"
|style="text-align:left;"| Al-Merrikh
|10||6||3||1||2||13||8||+5
|- bgcolor=
|style="text-align:left;"| Dolphins
|10||6||3||1||2||8||7||+1
|- bgcolor=
|style="text-align:left;"| Ismaily SC
|8||6||2||2||2||4||5||-1
|- bgcolor=
|style="text-align:left;"| Kwara United
|5||6||1||2||3||4||9||-5
|}

References

External links
2007 CAF Confederation Cup - goalzz.com

Group stage